Music is Live Andy Hui X Denise Ho Music is Live (TC: 許志安 X 何韻詩 2人交叉組合拉闊 03) is a live album that was recorded at Andy Hui and Denise Ho's 'Music is Live' Concert held by 903 id Club in 2003.

Track listing

Disc 1
Medley: (Andy Hui, Denise Ho)
再見露絲瑪莉
迷你與我
我沒有事
兄弟
燕尾蝶 - Dovetail Butterfly (Denise Ho)
青蛙王子 - Frog Prince (Denise Ho)
天使藍 - Angelic Blue (Denise Ho)
愛妳 - Love You (Denise Ho, not in VCD/DVD version)
七友 - Seven Friends (Denise Ho)
三角誌 - Love Triangle (Denise Ho)
灰飛煙滅 - Huifei Yanmie (Andy Hui)
大男人 (許志安, not in CD version) - Chauvinistic Man (Andy Hui)
Medley: (Andy Hui)
有了你
有病呻吟
身體健康
為妳鍾情
Play It Loud (Andy Hui)

Disc 2
Medley: (Andy Hui, Denise Ho)
將冰山劈開
妖女
壞女孩
夢伴
冰山大火
女人之苦 - Women's Suffering (Andy Hui, Denise Ho)
有得做 - Things to Do (Denise Ho)
絕對 - Absolute (Denise Ho)
我找到了 - I Have Found It (Denise Ho)
再見露絲瑪莉 - Goodbye... Rosemary (Denise Ho)
讓愛 - Let Love Be (Andy Hui)
活在當下 - Living In The Now (Andy Hui)
天下之大 - Size Of The World (Andy Hui)
501 (Andy Hui)
我的天我的歌 - My Day, My Song (Andy Hui)
半天假 - Half Day Off (Andy Hui, Denise Ho)
爛泥 - Mud (Andy Hui, Denise Ho)

External links
 HOCC WEB! Music is Live

2003 debut albums
Denise Ho albums
2003 live albums
2003 video albums
Live video albums